Byumba Province was one of the 12 former provinces (intara) of Rwanda and was situated in the north of the country, sharing a border with Uganda.

External links
 Rwandagateway.org

Former provinces of Rwanda
States and territories disestablished in 2006